Hans Hassenteufel (27 January 1887 – 15 August 1943) was a German painter of portraits and female nudes.

Life and work

He remained in Munich throughout his subsequent career, creating an immense number of female portraits and nudes, many done in Orientalist style. He occasionally painted landscapes and still-lifes. Many of his works were published in the form of postcards. Hassenteufel died in Munich in 1943.

Sources 
 Hassenteufel, Hans. In: Hans Vollmer (Ed.): Allgemeines Lexikon der bildenden Künstler des XX. Jahrhunderts. Vol.2: E–J. E. A. Seemann, Leipzig 1955, 
 Horst Ludwig: Münchner Maler im 19. Jahrhundert. Vol.5, Bruckmann, Munich 1993,  pg.350

External links 

 More works by Hassenteufel @ ArtNet

1887 births
1943 deaths
20th-century German painters
20th-century German male artists
German portrait painters
Artists from Hamburg